The 1950 West Virginia Mountaineers football team was an American football team that represented West Virginia University as a nmember of the Southern Conference (SoCon) during the 1950 college football season. In its first season under head coach Art Lewis, the team compiled a 2–8 record (1–3 against SoCon opponents), finished in 14th place in the conference, and was outscored by a combined total of 259 to 163. The team played its home games at Mountaineer Field in Morgantown, West Virginia. Lawrence Ciccarelli was the team captain.

Schedule

References

West Virginia
West Virginia Mountaineers football seasons
West Virginia Mountaineers football